Koonalda Cave is  a cave in the Australian state of South Australia, on the Nullarbor Plain in the locality of Nullarbor.  It is notable as an archeological site.

I.D. Lewis described the cave in 1976 as:Large doline 60m in diam. and 25m deep; talus slope to two main large passages connected by a high window; total length of cave 1200m; three lakes at -80m; narrow airspace beyond third lake leads to 45m diam. dome and lake; another 30m sump leads off this...

Thousands of square metres in the cave are covered in parallel finger-marked geometric lines and patterns, Indigenous Australian artwork which has been dated as 20,000 years old.

The cave was abandoned 19,000 years ago, and rediscovered by archeologists in 1956.

The cave was explored by an expedition led by Captain J. M. Thompson in 1935.

In the 1960s, the cave was excavated by Alexandor Gallus, who found that Aboriginal people had mined flint there.

Koonalda Cave was declared a prohibited area under the South Australian Aboriginal and Historic Relics Preservation Act 1965 on 30 May 1968.  It was listed on the South Australian Heritage Register on 4 March 1993 and inscribed onto the Australian National Heritage List on 15 October 2014.  It was also listed on the now-defunct Register of the National Estate.

In December 2022, it was reported that some of the artwork was destroyed by vandals who had illegally gained access to the cave at some time since June, prompting calls from the local Mirning people, who consider the site to be sacred, for the state and federal governments to improve security and legal protection for the cave.

See also 
 List of sinkholes of Australia
 Warratyi

References

Sinkholes of Australia
Caves of South Australia
Archaeological sites in South Australia
Australian Aboriginal cultural history
Prehistoric art
Paleoanthropological sites
Nullarbor Plain
Australian National Heritage List
South Australian Heritage Register
South Australian places listed on the defunct Register of the National Estate